The Long Hill Township School System is a community public school district that serves students in pre-kindergarten through eighth grade in Long Hill Township in Morris County, New Jersey, United States.

As of the 2019–20 school year, the district, comprised of three schools, had an enrollment of 894 students and 80.6 classroom teachers (on an FTE basis), for a student–teacher ratio of 11.1:1.

The district is classified by the New Jersey Department of Education as being in District Factor Group "I", the second-highest of eight groupings. District Factor Groups organize districts statewide to allow comparison by common socioeconomic characteristics of the local districts. From lowest socioeconomic status to highest, the categories are A, B, CD, DE, FG, GH, I and J.

Long Hill Township's high school students in public school for ninth through twelfth grades attend Watchung Hills Regional High School in Warren Township.  Students from Long Hill Township and from the neighboring communities of Green Brook Township, Warren Township and Watchung (in Somerset County) attend the school. As of the 2019–20 school year, the high school had an enrollment of 1,948 students and 160.6 classroom teachers (on an FTE basis), for a student–teacher ratio of 12.1:1.

Schools 
Schools in the district (with 2019–20 enrollment data from the National Center for Education Statistics) are:
Elementary schools
Gillette School with 223 students in grades PreK-1
Dr. Lori Jones, Principal
Millington School with 397 students in grades 2-5
Jennifer S. Dawson, Principal
Middle school
Central Middle School with 269 students in grades 6-8
Michael Viturello, Principal

Administration
Core members of the district's administration are:
Dr. Anne Mucci, Superintendent 
Daniel A. Borgo, Interim Business Administrator / Board Secretary

Board of education
The district's board of education is comprised of nine members who set policy and oversee the fiscal and educational operation of the district through its administration. As a Type II school district, the board's trustees are elected directly by voters to serve three-year terms of office on a staggered basis, with three seats up for election each year held (since 2012) as part of the November general election. The board appoints a superintendent to oversee the day-to-day operation of the district.

References

External links
Long Hill Township School System
 
School Data for the Long Hill Township School System, National Center for Education Statistics
Watchung Hills Regional High School website

Long Hill Township, New Jersey
New Jersey District Factor Group I
School districts in Morris County, New Jersey